George "Leki" Fotu (born August 23, 1998) is an American football nose tackle for the Arizona Cardinals of the National Football League (NFL). He played college football at Utah and was drafted by the Cardinals in the fourth round of the 2020 NFL Draft.

High school career
Fotu played high school rugby and high school football at Herriman High School, playing defensive end and sporadic tight end. His team won the Utah 5A state championship his senior season. Fotu committed to Utah on September 20, 2015, choosing the Utes over USC, Brigham Young and Oklahoma State.

College career
After his sophomore season, Utah coaches considered moving Fotu from defensive end to offensive tackle, but Fotu instead moved to defensive tackle and claimed the starting spot at that position.
At the end of his junior season, Fotu was named first-team all-Pac-12 Conference.

Before his senior season, Fotu was named a preseason All-American by ESPN.
During the season, after a game against Cal, Fotu was named Pac-12 Defensive Player of the Week after recording a 13-yard sack. He was named second-team midseason All-American by the Associated Press.

Professional career

Fotu was drafted by the Arizona Cardinals in the fourth round with the 114th overall pick of the 2020 NFL Draft. He was placed on injured reserve with an ankle injury on November 14, 2020, and activated on December 5, 2020. In Week 15 against the Philadelphia Eagles, Fotu recorded his first career sack on fellow rookie Jalen Hurts during the 33–26 win.

Fotu entered the 2021 season as the backup nose tackle for the Cardinals. He played in 17 games with three starts, recording 19 tackles, three passes defensed, and a forced fumble.

Personal life
Three of Fotu's brothers have also played college football. Before focusing on football, Fotu also played rugby. Both of Fotu's parents were born in Tonga, but moved to America before Leki was born.

References

External links
Arizona Cardinals bio
Utah Utes bio

1998 births
Living people
American football defensive tackles
American people of Tongan descent
Arizona Cardinals players
Players of American football from Oakland, California
Rugby union players that played in the NFL
Utah Utes football players